Five Score and Seven Years Ago is the fifth studio album by Christian rock band Relient K. It was released on March 6, 2007, and is the first full-length album by the band to feature bassist John Warne (replacing founding member Brian Pittman) and guitarist Jon Schneck. Furthermore, it would serve as drummer Dave Douglas' last album with the band until Air for Free (2016). Future drummer Ethan Luck makes his debut on the track "Deathbed".

Production
Due to being signed with Capitol Records, the band was given the blessing of a pre-production period for the first time. Guitarist Matt Hoopes stated that this was a good thing, citing how the band members no longer all lived in Ohio.

While posting on the band and the recording process, a fan on CMCentral.com said, "They recorded for a couple weeks in LA with Howard Benson. This is the first time Relient K will use a different producer, as Mark Lee Townsend has recorded everything they've released up to this point. (Matt Thiessen has co-produced on a few things). They finished the album with Townsend at his studio."

The band's long-time producer Mark Lee Townsend also spoke of the album being recorded on his site. He produced the first track and the last track of the album, as well as "Crayons Can Melt On Us For All I Care". In one of his blogs, he said, "It was a great day in the studio with Relient K today. We've been working on a song for the record that is a bit of an epic in many ways with a ton of tracks and instruments. It's going to be pretty special when it all gets recorded and mixed. We are almost done with lead vocals on it and will be putting live strings on it next week, along with a few other parts that are a bit unconventional to pop punk. I'll keep you posted. The weather has been spectacular this last week and it's great for shooting hoops on breaks from the studio. Based on what I have heard from the tracks in L.A. and what we are doing here, the new album will be amazing."

Townsend also said later, "It's been a great week back in the studio with Relient K. We are working on a few album cuts and some additional acoustic versions of songs on the record. This week we got drums and bass done on the songs and will spend the next couple weeks filling out the rest of the songs. Matt is still finishing up some of the writing on a ballad we've been assembling and it's going to be an amazing track when we get done. It's one of those tracks where you just start putting it together, and it's very bare bones right now, but you know it's going to turn out really special. I heard a couple of the test mixes on some of the songs done in LA and it sounds fantastic and 'famous' IMHO."

Townsend also spoke of the epic track that he and Matt Thiessen were working on at that point, which was a cover of a popular Christmas song by James Krader. The song turned out to be "Deathbed". Townsend said, "Well, the Relient K album is pretty much done at this point. It's a fantastic piece of music from top to bottom and I'm sure the fans will love it. I'm sure they will have something posted on their MySpace or website with details and a bit of music. Poor Matt T had to work his butt off with me the last week as we added a bunch of instruments to the 11 minute epic we were working on. Matt dusted off his horn playing skills from high school and played trumpet, trombone, french horn, and baritone on the song. We clocked in at 115 tracks including live strings, horns, a bunch of mellotron stuff, 3 different drum kits, ukulele, sleigh bells, micromoog and more. We had fun working on the track with all the instruments, but it was a lot of work and I think we are all glad that it is done. JR McNeely mixed it over a couple of days and it sounds amazing. I think we all are stoked about it."

Title and cover art
According to lead singer, Matt Thiessen, the album was created with a "Five" theme, as it is the band's fifth album, and for the first time Relient K has five members on an album. The "Seven Years Ago" links with the fact that the group's first album was created seven years prior to the release of this album, making for five albums in seven years. It also ties in with the famous line, "Four score and seven years ago", delivered by Abraham Lincoln in the Gettysburg Address. Lincoln is addressed in the first track, "Plead the Fifth". A poster advertising a concert for the band around the album's release depicted a cartoon Abraham Lincoln on it as well.

The cover of the album depicts the five band members staring up in the sky from a sidewalk, and they are all wearing parkas. Jon Schneck stands behind Matt Thiessen, so there are four shadows crossing the shadow of the curb, creating five in tally marks. Capitol Records released a promotional image about a month before the album's release, and the band's manager announced that it was not the album cover. The official cover was confirmed on the Gotee Records website. The promo image showed five sticks made into tally marks, with seven leaves either on the sticks, or falling off them. This image was on the back of the promo insert that advertised the new Relient K fan club that came with the CD.

Release
The music video for "Must Have Done Something Right" was posted online on February 10, 2007. Five Score and Seven Years Ago was released on March 6, 2007, through Capitol. From early March to late May, the band went on a tour of the U.S. with support from Mae and Sherwood. During this trek, they appeared at The Bamboozle festival. A special edition of Five Score and Seven Years Ago was also released, including a bonus DVD with roughly thirty minutes of acoustic performances shot in the Capitol A Studios and including track-to-track interviews with the band. Also included is a making-of feature on the "Must Have Done Something Right" music video as well as the video itself, which was directed by Marc Webb. The album's cover also came with a special slip-cover that outlined the band members in orange drawings.

On June 6, 2007, the music video for "The Best Thing" was posted online. From mid-October to early December, the group went on a co-headlining US tour with Switchfoot, dubbed The Appetite for Construction Tour. A single, "Forgiven," which was released for the Christian radio market, began playing around December 1. Must Have Done Something Right was released to iTunes on November 28, along with a non-album bonus song titled "Fallen Man," also sometimes referred to as "(Hope for Every) Fallen Man."  The Best Buy exclusive download referenced above is an entirely new recording of "Fallen Man" and not the same as the iTunes track. Between June and August 2008, the band performed on the 2008 edition of Warped Tour. In October and November, the band went on tour with This Providence, Ludo and House of Heroes. In November and December, the band went on the Winter Wonder-Slam Tour in the US with TobyMac. During the tour, the band performed Christmas songs alongside their regular songs.

Reception

Five Score and Seven Years Ago debuted at number six on the U.S. Billboard 200, selling about 64,000 copies in its first week. As of July 11, 2007, it has sold 152,560 copies in the US. BuzzFeed included the album at No. 36 on the website's "36 Pop Punk Albums You Need To Hear Before You F——ing Die" list.

Track listing

Bonus tracks

Wal-Mart Downloads
"Up and Up (Acoustic Version)"
"Devastation and Reform (Video) [This is now available on iTunes in High-Quality iTunes Plus]"

Best Buy Exclusive Download
"Fallen Man (Acoustic Version)"

iTunes Exclusive Download
"Sloop John B"

DVD bonus tracks
The deluxe edition of the album features a DVD with six acoustic bonus tracks, recorded at the Capitol Studios.
 "I So Hate Consequences" (includes a piano-only chorus of "Life After Death and Taxes (Failure II)")
 "Who I Am Hates Who I've Been"
 "Faking My Own Suicide"
 "Sloop John B" (Beach Boys cover)
 "Give Until There's Nothing Left"
 "Devastation and Reform"

The DVD also features the making of the video "Must Have Done Something Right" and the video itself.

Chart positions and sales certifications
In its four full weeks of being on the Billboard 200, Five Score and Seven Years Ago is eligible for a gold status in the United States and has sold over 750,000 copies worldwide.

Singles
Must Have Done Something Right (mainstream)
Forgiven (Christian radio)
The Best Thing (mainstream + Christian radio)
I Need You (Christian radio)
Give Until There's Nothing Left (Christian radio)
Devastation and Reform (Christian radio)

Credits 

Relient K
 Matt Thiessen – lead vocals, acoustic piano, organ, toy piano, guitars, trombone, trumpet, euphonium, French horn, penny whistle, percussion, horns (14)
 Matt Hoopes – guitars, banjo, mandolin, backing vocals
 Jon Schneck – guitars, backing vocals
 John Warne – bass guitar, backing vocals
 Dave Douglas – drums, backing vocals

Additional personnel
 Howard Benson – Hammond B3 organ (1, 11, 14), keyboards (2-10, 12, 13), programming (2-10, 12, 13)
 Mark Vangool – pedal steel guitar (10)
 Paul DeCarli – harmonica (10)
 Ethan Luck – moon drums (14)
 Mark Lee Townsend – claps (1), stomps (1), ukulele (14), percussion (14), vocals (14)
 Hatsukazu Inagaki – tuba (6)
 Carol Rabinowitz – cello (14)
 Chris Carmichael – viola (14), violin (14)
 Josh Auer – additional vocals (3)
 Ned Brower – additional vocals (3, 5)
 Jon Foreman – vocals (14)

Production
 Jamie Feldman – A&R
 Mark Lee Townsend – producer (1, 11, 14), engineer (1, 11, 14)
 Matt Thiessen – producer (1, 11, 14)
 Howard Benson – producer (2-10, 12, 13)
 Mike Plotnikoff – recording (2-10, 12, 13)
 Hatsukazu "Hatch" Inagaki – assistant engineer (2-10, 12, 13)
 Paul DeCarli – Pro Tools editing
 J.R. McNeely – mixing (1, 11, 14)
 Chris Lord-Alge – mixing (2-10, 12, 13)
 Adam Deane – mix assistant (1, 11, 14)
 Keith Armstrong – mix assistant (2-10, 12, 13)
 Nik Karpen – mix assistant (2-10, 12, 13)
 Ted Jensen – mastering at Sterling Sound (New York City, New York)
 Eric Roinestad – art direction 
 Megan Steinman – art direction 
 Sunja Park – design 
 Ben Watts – photography 
 Jeff Risden – management 
 Mark Vangool – guitar technician 
 Jon Nicholson – drum technician

References

External links
 Five Score and Seven Years Ago E-Card

2007 albums
Capitol Records albums
Relient K albums
Albums produced by Howard Benson
Albums produced by Mark Lee Townsend